New Hampshire's 21st State Senate district is one of 24 districts in the New Hampshire Senate. It has been represented by Democrat Rebecca Perkins Kwoka since 2020, succeeding fellow Democrat Martha Fuller Clark.

Geography
District 21 covers parts of Rockingham and Strafford Counties. The district is located entirely within New Hampshire's 1st congressional district. It borders the state of Maine.

Rockingham County - 11% of county

 Portsmouth
 New Castle
 Newington
 Newfields
 Newmarket

''Strafford County -'' 17% of county

 Durham
 Madbury
 Lee

Federal and statewide results in District 21 
Results are of elections held under 2022 district lines.

Recent election results

Historical election results
The following result occurred prior to 2022 redistricting, and thus were held under different district lines.

2020

2018

2016

2014

2012

References

21
Rockingham County, New Hampshire
Strafford County, New Hampshire